William McCabe (born 30 August 1935) is a former Australian rules footballer and Olympian. He played with North Melbourne in the Victorian Football League (VFL) and represented Australia in Water polo at the 1956 Summer Olympics.

McCabe, a goalkeeper, was the youngest member of Australia's water polo team in the Melbourne Olympics, at 21 years of age. He played against Great Britain, Singapore and the Soviet Union. One of his teammates was St Kilda forward Peter Bennett.

The following year McCabe made his VFL debut with North Melbourne and made four appearances in total for his debut season. In 1958 the club had a strong season and finished in third position but McCabe could only put together two games. His father, also named Bill, played 42 games for North Melbourne.

See also
 Australia men's Olympic water polo team records and statistics
 List of men's Olympic water polo tournament goalkeepers

References

External links
 

1935 births
North Melbourne Football Club players
Olympic water polo players of Australia
Water polo players at the 1956 Summer Olympics
Australian rules footballers from Victoria (Australia)
Living people
Australian male water polo players
Water polo goalkeepers